Hythe to Calshot Marshes is a  biological Site of Special Scientific Interest which stretches along the west bank of Southampton Water between Calshot and Marchwood in Hampshire. It is part of Solent and Southampton Water Ramsar site and  Special Protection Area, and of Solent Maritime Special Area of Conservation. Calshot Marshes is a Local Nature Reserve and Hythe Spartina Marsh is a nature reserve managed by the Hampshire and Isle of Wight Wildlife Trust.

These areas of saltmarsh and mudflats have nationally important numbers of wintering waders and wildfowl, such as black-tailed godwit, grey plover and dunlin. The site is internationally important for dark-bellied brent geese as it has over 1% of the world population. The benthic zone has a dense concentration of invertebrates which provide the birds' main food.

References

 
Sites of Special Scientific Interest in Hampshire